Breathing Walker was an American experimental rock band formed by Moss Icon members including Jonathan Vance (vocals and lyrics) and Mark Laurence (drums), along with Alex Badertscher (bass), Tim Horner (violin), and Zak Fusciello (drums and percussion). The other members of Moss Icon, Tonie Joy (guitar) and Monica DiGialleonardo (bass) joined the band prior to their first live performance and recording session. After this short lived project, Alex Badertscher joined Moss Icon as a second guitarist.
Breathing Walker only released one album, which was self-titled and released on the Vermin Scum record label.

Discography 
 Breathing Walker cassette (1990, Vermin Scum)
CD/LP reissue (2001, Vermin Scum)

References

American experimental rock groups
Rock music groups from Maryland
Musical groups from Baltimore